Clystea ocina is a moth of the subfamily Arctiinae. It was described by Herbert Druce in 1883. It is found in Bolivia.

References

Clystea
Moths described in 1883